Kishoreganj is a city and the headquarters of Kishoreganj District in the division of Dhaka, Bangladesh.

See also 
 ABM Zahidul Haq
 Pakundia Adarsha Mohila College

References

Kishoreganj District
Dhaka Division